Rongseemaechaithanachotiwat Phayao Football Club (Thai สโมสรฟุตบอลโรงสีแม่ใจธนะโชติวัฒน์ พะเยา), is a Thai professional football club based in Mueang, Phayao, Thailand. The club is currently playing in the Thai League 3 Northern region.

Timeline
History of events of Rongseemaechaithanachotiwat Phayao Football Club

Stadium and locations

Season by season record

P = Played
W = Games won
D = Games drawn
L = Games lost
F = Goals for
A = Goals against
Pts = Points
Pos = Final position

QR1 = First Qualifying Round
QR2 = Second Qualifying Round
R1 = Round 1
R2 = Round 2
R3 = Round 3
R4 = Round 4

R5 = Round 5
R6 = Round 6
QF = Quarter-finals
SF = Semi-finals
RU = Runners-up
W = Winners

References

External links
 Official Website of Rongseemaechaithanachotiwat Phayao F.C.
 Official Facebookpage of Rongseemaechaithanachotiwat Phayao F.C.

Football clubs in Thailand
Association football clubs established in 2010
Phayao province
2010 establishments in Thailand